Ignacio "Nacho" Martín Scocco (born 29 May 1985) is an Argentine retired professional footballer who last played as a forward for Newell's Old Boys. He has also played for clubs in Mexico, Greece, the United Arab Emirates, England and Brazil.

Club career

Newell's Old Boys
The Newell's Old Boys youth program quickly picked this young man up, and he was just nineteen when he made his debut in the Argentine top flight against San Lorenzo. He scored 17 goals in 75 games and played alongside players such as Fernando Belluschi and Ariel Ortega in the championship winning team of Apertura 2004. He also scored a very important goal for Newell's Old Boys against Boca Juniors scoring in the 82nd minute putting his club 1–0 up. In the summer of 2006 Scocco signed for Pumas UNAM for a fee of $3.5m, but stated to the newspaper «Reforma» that one day he would return to Newell's Old Boys.

"El Tucán", was a regular fixture in the Newell's Old Boys setup, and during the Clausura 2006 season he scored nine goals in 18 games, but better was to come in the 2006 edition of the Libertadores where Newell's reached the knockout stage. Scocco's four goals in just five starts were crucial to their campaign. Scocco wore the number 32 in the famous red and black shirts.

When Ricardo "Tuca" Ferretti took over Pumas UNAM, and his main strikers Joaquín Botero and Bruno Marioni left he was willing to sign Scocco for $3.5m.

Club Universidad Nacional
In 2006, Scocco joined Mexican side Pumas for $3.5 million. He made his debut against Chiapas, and during his second appearance against Veracruz he scored his first goal, from the goal kick. Scocco also scored a hat-trick for Pumas against Querétaro. Scocco scored his last goal for Pumas UNAM against Veracruz, gaining Pumas UNAM 4–2. Scocco was a mainstay in the Pumas starting team, his strike partner was Esteban Solari. Scocco ended his career at Pumas with 53 appearances and 18 goals.

Scocco reinforces the Deportivo Toluca borrowed from the Pumas UNAM order by Americo Gallego in the quarter finals of the Copa Libertadores 2007.

AEK Athens
Scocco signed a three-year contract with AEK Athens on 18 June 2008. AEK Athens signed Scocco for a fee of €1.5 million and will be earning €400,000 per year. Scocco was the fourth Argentine AEK Athens player. The others are Sebastián Saja, Ismael Blanco and Cristian Nasuti.
During his time at AEK, Scocco has been mostly used as a right winger and sometimes also as a second striker which was his preferred position.

Scocco also scored two goals past Olympiacos on 6 January 2010 and won AEK the match 2–1 away in the Karaiskakis Stadium. This performance earned him the Man Of The Match award and certainly his remarkable 40 yard free kick, his second goal. The following week he scored against Atromitos and then Panathinaikos. Scocco also scored a goal against Panthrakikos and a free kick against Panionios one minute before the end of the match making the score 1–1.

On 16 September 2010, Scocco scored the third and final goal on AEK's first European match against Hajduk Split. This was the first goal of the season for Scocco. AEK won the match 3–1. Three days later Scocco scored with a 30-yard shot against Asteras Tripolis. On 17 October 2010, Scocco scored a 40-yard strike against Aris Thessaloniki, and followed up with a second goal for a 4–0 victory.

On 25 November 2010, Scocco renewed his contract with AEK signing a new three-year deal which would keep him at the club until 2013. Scocco's contract was worth €3.6 million, earning €1 million per year and a buy-out clause worth €3 million for foreign teams

On 18 May 2011, Scocco scored a 38-yard shot against PAOK Thessaloniki for AEK to take the lead in a 2–1 defeat. Due to financial problems, AEK Athens had to sell Scocco (cheaper than his buy-out clause, if necessary), to relieve itself of his expensive contract.

He left the club after 120 appearances (33 goals, 29 assists) in all competitions.

Al Ain
In June 2011, Scocco joined Al Ain FC for €2.8 million signing a contract worth €4.8 million per season plus a €1 million bonus if Al Ain win the UAE Championship. In the season 2011–12 UAE Pro-League, Al Ain won the championship and later he left UAE by not signing a new contract deal due to family reasons. In August 2011, Scocco was loaned to Newell's Old Boys to return to Argentina and his family after a six-year absence from his home country.

Return to Argentina and Newell's
Scocco returned to his homeland, Argentina, to join Newell's Old Boys, his first professional team, as well as other Argentine stars such as Gabriel Heinze and Maxi Rodríguez. Newell's finished second for the Championship, as a result to enter to Copa Libertadores of the next season. Scocco played an important role for his team, scoring 13 goals and became the top scorer of the league alongside Facundo Ferreyra of Vélez Sársfield. During the season Newells rejected a €3 million offer from Fenerbahçe considering the offer too low, having set Scocco 7m buy out clause. His impressive performances in Argentine Primera División, Copa Libertadores and his two-goal debut in the national team against Brazil attracted the interest of Atlético Madrid.

Scocco also led his team to win the 2013 Torneo Final championship and proceed to the Final of the Argentine Primera División against the 2012 Torneo Inicial winners, Vélez Sársfield, the team who deprived Newell's of the first place. Scocco scored 11 goals for his team and retained his position as top scorer of the Championship in 2013 season, sharing his position, this time with Emanuel Gigliotti of Colón. On 30 June, Newell's lost 1–0 on the final of the Championship although dominating in all the duration of the match. Newell's reached 2013 Copa Libertadores semi final, that they were eliminated by  Ronaldinho's Atlético Mineiro in a penalty shootout (2–0 loss in the real time, in a 2–2 aggregate followed by the Newell's 2–0 victory on the first leg). Scocco scored six goals in the tournament and finished second scorer alongside Diego Tardelli, behind Jô.

Internacional
On 1 July 2013, Scocco joined Internacional for €4.25 million rejecting the offer from São Paulo FC. On 15 August, Scocco scored two goals in a minute against Botafogo in a 3–3 draw.

Sunderland
On 30 January 2014, Sunderland completed the transfer of Scocco for €3.65 million, signing a two-and-a-half-year deal, as one of Gus Poyet's four transfer window signings. 
Asked about Scocco in April, South American football expert Tim Vickery wrote in his weekly BBC Sport column: "He might not be a big target man centre-forward, but he has some penalty area presence and moves outside the area with fluidity and intelligence." Although Sunderland avoided relegation the one-cap Argentina international failed to score in eight appearances, all of which came from the bench. He was an unused substitute as the side lost the 2014 Football League Cup Final 3–1 to Manchester City on 2 March.

On 23 July 2014, Sunderland confirmed his departure back to Argentina, returning for his third spell with Newell's Old Boys.

Newell's Old Boys, third spell
On 13 July 2014, Scocco joined Newell's Old Boys for €2.7 million, on a five years' contract. On his presentation at Estadio Marcelo Bielsa, 7,000 fans were gathered in the stadium. He was given his favourite number, "32".

After the 2014–15 season Scocco's future at Newell's Old Boys was in doubt and he was linked with a return to AEK Athens. Eventually, despite the improved offer by AEK, Nacho Scocco has decided to stay at Newell's Old Boys.

In June 2017 Scocco was again linked with a return to AEK Athens. Newell's Old Boys was dealing with financial problems leaving the 32-year old unpaid for over five months.

He left the club after 155 appearances (67 goals, 13 assists) in all competitions.

River Plate
On 29 June 2017, Scocco chose River Plate as his next destination, signing a three-year contract for a transfer fee of $3,000,000. The transfer procedures lasted for days, as Judge Fabián Bellizia, who runs the Newell's trust, rejected River Plate's first offer of $1,800,000. Despite an initial offer of $2,600,000 from Club Atlético Independiente and the loan of Lucas Albertengo being rejected, Scocco insisted to play in the Monumental. The manager of River Plate wanted to have Scocco as soon as possible, as he would replace Sebastián Driussi who joined FC Zenit Saint Petersburg for €20 million. On 4 July 2017, he made his debut in the club as a starter in a 2–0 away win against Guarani FC in the 2017 Copa Libertadores.
On 21 September 2017, he scored five goals for River Plate in their 8–0 comeback home 2017 Copa Libertadores quarterfinals win against Bolivian side Jorge Wilstermann. 
On 8 October, Scocco continued to impress, scoring two goals in three minutes in a 3–0 victory over Defensa y Justicia in the Copa Argentina. In total, in 11 appearances with the club, he has scored 11 goals and had one assist. 
On 1 November 2017, in the Copa Libertadores semifinals games against rivals Lanús was the key scorer in both games, but was not enough to avoid the exclusion from the final.

On 9 December 2017, in the 2017 Copa Argentina Final he opened the score in the 2–1 win game against Atlético Tucumán. 
On 4 February 2018, Scocco scored a wonderful goal in a 2–0 home win game against Club Olimpo. 'Nacho' received the ball in the centre of the field, swivelled around and with 8 touches ran more than half the length of the field, dribbling past five outfield players before he left goalkeeper Jorge Carranza on his backside with a feint, and slotted the ball into the net. Fans claimed that was the best goal of the last decade in international football.

On 14 March 2018, Scocco (69') scored two minutes after his entrance in the game, sealing River Plate's 2–0 win against rivals Boca Juniors in the 2017 Supercopa Argentina game played at Estadio Malvinas Argentinas in Mendoza. On 19 March 2018, he scored a brace in a 3–1 home win game against Club Atlético Belgrano. On 23 September 2018, he scored in a 2–0 away derby against rivals Boca Juniors. Scocco helped his club to reach  2018 Copa Libertadores final, but an injury to the right calf, will definitely be left out of the first final, on 10 November 2018, of the Copa Libertadores against Boca Juniors at Bombonera. Scocco's injury occurred in the first half of the game that River lost last weekend against Estudiantes de La Plata, 1–0 by the Superliga. River Plate's coach Marcelo Gallardo's idea is to preserve him so that he gets in good condition for the rematch, on Saturday the 24th.

Scocco began the 2019-20 season as a substitute of Rafael Santos Borré, but he succeeded to have four goals in the league this year, and has struggled as a replacement for most of the Copa Libertadores games on a path that brings River Plate to the  2019 Copa Libertadores final for the second consecutive season, this time against Flamengo.

Newell's final spell
After the end of his contract with River Plate at 1 July, Scocco returned once again to Newell's in order to end his career at his childhood club. At 35 years of age, a club legend, Newell's announced his return  with an instagram post with his 32-numbered shirt with the description "Nacho is back! The heart rules and Scocco knows it. Happy that you are in your place again. Welcome to the Park!.

International career

Argentina Under-20
Scocco started his youth international career in 2004, Scocco has had 12 appearances and scored three goals, he made his debut against Colombia on 27 July 2004. On 3 November 2004, Scocco made his second appearance against Paraguay and scored in the 77th minute making Argentina 2–0 up. Scocco was also called up to be part of the 2005 FIFA World Youth Championship. Scocco played two matches in the tournament against Uzbekistan on 1 December 2005 and against Mali on 4 December 2005. Scocco also played alongside Lionel Messi and Sergio Agüero.

Argentina
On 15 April 2005, José Pekerman called up Scocco for a friendly against Chile but didn't make an appearance. On 3 June 2005, Scocco was called up for another friendly for Argentina against Puerto Rico, but pulled a hamstring and was forced out for a couple of weeks and was not included in the match.

After impressing Argentine coach Alfio Basile, Scocco was called up for an unofficial friendly match against Guatemala on 6 February 2008, Scocco played 20 minutes in the match and came on for Ezequiel Lavezzi. Scocco was also included in the 21 man squad against Venezuela on 20 August 2008.

Scocco was included in the squad for the 2012 Superclásico de las Américas. He made his debut on the senior team playing the second leg, scoring two goals and also his penalty at the penalty shootout.

International goals
Scores and results list Argentina's goal tally first, score column indicates score after each Scocco goal.

Honours
Newell's Old Boys
Primera División: 2004 Apertura, 2013 Final

AEK Athens
Greek Cup: 2010–11

Al Ain
UAE Pro-League: 2011–12

River Plate
Copa Argentina: 2017, 2019
Supercopa Argentina: 2017
Copa Libertadores: 2018
Recopa Sudamericana: 2019

Individual
Top scorer of Primera División Argentina: 2012–13, 2013–14 
Awards Nova Super League Team of the year: 2009–10

References

External links
 
 
 Argentine Primera statistics at Fútbol XXI 

1985 births
Living people
Association football forwards
People from General López Department
Argentine footballers
Argentina international footballers
AEK Athens F.C. players
Sunderland A.F.C. players
Premier League players
Newell's Old Boys footballers
Club Universidad Nacional footballers
Deportivo Toluca F.C. players
Al Ain FC players
Sport Club Internacional players
Club Atlético River Plate footballers
Argentine expatriate footballers
Expatriate footballers in Brazil
Expatriate footballers in Mexico
Expatriate footballers in Greece
Expatriate footballers in the United Arab Emirates
Expatriate footballers in England
Argentine Primera División players
Liga MX players
Super League Greece players
Campeonato Brasileiro Série A players
Argentine expatriate sportspeople in the United Arab Emirates
UAE Pro League players
Argentine people of Italian descent
Sportspeople from Santa Fe Province